The Tereblia is a right tributary of the river Tisza in the Zakarpattia Oblast, western Ukraine. It flows through the villages Synevyr, Kolochava, Drahovo and Tereblia, and discharges into the Tisza in Bushtyno.

References

Rivers of Zakarpattia Oblast
Braided rivers in Ukraine